NGC 960 is a spiral galaxy in the constellation Cetus. The galaxy was discovered in 1886 by Francis Preserved Leavenworth.

See also 
 List of NGC objects (1–1000)

References

External links 
 

Intermediate spiral galaxies
0960
Cetus (constellation)
009621